Philonicus is a genus of robber flies in the family Asilidae. There are at least 20 described species in Philonicus.

Species
These 22 species belong to the genus Philonicus:

 Philonicus albiceps (Meigen, 1820) c g
 Philonicus albospinosus (Bellardi, 1861) c g
 Philonicus arizonensis (Williston, 1893) c g
 Philonicus curtatus Oldroyd, 1964 c g
 Philonicus elutus Loew, 1871 c g
 Philonicus flebeius (Osten Sacken, 1887) c g
 Philonicus fuliginosus (Bellardi, 1861) c g
 Philonicus fuscatus (Hine, 1909) i c g b
 Philonicus ghilarovi Lehr, 1988 c g
 Philonicus iliensis Lehr, 1970 c g
 Philonicus ionescui Tsacas, 1977 c g
 Philonicus limpidipennis (Hine, 1909) i c g
 Philonicus longulus Wulp, 1872 c g
 Philonicus nagatomii Utsuki, 2008 c g
 Philonicus nigrosetosus Wulp, 1881 c g
 Philonicus plebeius Osten Sacken i c g b
 Philonicus rufipennis Hine, 1907 i c g b
 Philonicus scaurus (Walker, 1849) c g
 Philonicus sichanensis Tsacas, 1977 c g
 Philonicus truquii (Bellardi, 1861) i c g
 Philonicus tuxpanganus (Bellardi, 1862) c g
 Philonicus vagans (Wiedemann, 1828) c g

Data sources: i = ITIS, c = Catalogue of Life, g = GBIF, b = Bugguide.net

References

Further reading

External links

 

Asilidae
Articles created by Qbugbot
Asilidae genera